Gregory Sukochev (born 18 February 1988, in Tashkent) is an Australian volleyball player. He competed for Australia at the 2012 Summer Olympics.

References

Australian men's volleyball players
Volleyball players at the 2012 Summer Olympics
Olympic volleyball players of Australia
1988 births
Living people
Naturalised citizens of Australia